The enzyme 2-dehydropantoate aldolase catalyzes the chemical reaction:

2-dehydropantoate  3-methyl-2-oxobutanoate + formaldehyde

This enzyme belongs to the family of lyases, specifically the aldehyde-lyases, which cleave carbon-carbon bonds.  The systematic name of this enzyme class is 2-dehydropantoate formaldehyde-lyase (3-methyl-2-oxobutanoate-forming). Other names in common use include ketopantoaldolase, and 2-dehydropantoate formaldehyde-lyase.

References

 

EC 4.1.2
Enzymes of unknown structure